Alejandro Méndez García (born 28 July 2001), simply known as Alex Méndez, is a Spanish professional footballer who currently plays for Fortuna Liga club DAC Dunajská Streda as a defender.

Club career

MFK Zemplín Michalovce
Alex Méndez made his Fortuna Liga debut for Zemplín Michalovce against Ružomberok on 21 June 2020.

References

External links
 
 
 Futbalnet profile 

2001 births
Living people
Footballers from Elche
Spanish footballers
Spanish expatriate footballers
Association football defenders
CD Alcoyano footballers
MFK Zemplín Michalovce players
FC DAC 1904 Dunajská Streda players
Tercera División players
Slovak Super Liga players
Expatriate footballers in Slovakia
Spanish expatriate sportspeople in Slovakia